Straßburger Straße is an underground rapid transit station located in the Hamburg district of Dulsberg, Germany. The station was opened in 1963 and is served by Hamburg U-Bahn line U1.

Service

Trains 
Straßburger Straße is served by Hamburg U-Bahn line U1; departures are every 5 minutes. The travel time to Hamburg Hauptbahnhof takes about 13 minutes.

Gallery

See also 

 List of Hamburg U-Bahn stations

References

External links 

 Line and route network plans at hvv.de 

Hamburg U-Bahn stations in Hamburg
U1 (Hamburg U-Bahn) stations
Buildings and structures in Hamburg-Nord
Railway stations in Germany opened in 1963
1963 establishments in West Germany